The Cass criterion, also known as the Malinvaud–Cass criterion, is a central result in theory of overlapping generations models in economics. It is named after David Cass.

A major feature which sets overlapping generations models in economics apart from the standard model with a finite number of infinitely lived individuals is that the First Welfare Theorem might not hold—that is, competitive equilibria may be not be Pareto optimal.

If  represents the vector of Arrow–Debreu commodity prices prevailing in period  and if

	

then a competitive equilibrium allocation is inefficient.

References 

Economics and time